Newly Single is a 2017 American arthouse meta dark comedy film written and directed by Adam Christian Clark.

Set in Downtown Los Angeles over the course of a winter, the script focuses on the dark and often funny moments of a newly-single and increasingly abrasive filmmaker.

Plot 
After ridiculing his girlfriend’s belief in Scientology, director Astor Williams Stevenson finds himself single and trying to discover what exactly it is he wants.  At the same time he attempts to get a film off the ground and soon learns that his creative vision will not align with that of his crew. As Astor goes on a number of dates his abrasiveness and cynical attitude towards life seems to become ever more crystallised.

Reminiscent of great American cinema of the 1970s with a somewhat staccato structure made up of disparate moments, it is still a thoroughly modern affair replete with some graphic sexuality and an often harsh takedown on modern views of dating.

Cast 
 Adam Christian Clark as Astor
 Jennifer Kim as Izzy
 Molly C. Quinn as Valerie
 Anna Jacoby-Heron as Madeline
 Rémy Bennett as Francine
 Greg Gilreath as Lawrence
 Raychel Diane Weiner as Maria
 Marguerite Moreau as Charlee
 Alexandra Skye as Belle
 Jennifer Prediger as Emily
 Lindsey Kraft as Jackie

Production 
The film's main location, Astor's apartment, was filmed in Clark's real-life apartment in Downtown Los Angeles' Continental Building.

Release 
Newly Single premiered in the main competition of the 2017 edition of PÖFF.

The film was released in North America in 2018 by Gravitas Ventures.

Reception 
The film holds an 88% rating, on Rotten Tomatoes.

The New York Times described the film as a dark comedy "probing the sexual and professional misadventures of a struggling filmmaker."

Rob Aldam of Backseat Mafia called the film "a brilliant take on narcissism and a total lack of self-awareness." In contrast, Chuck Foster of Film Threat barbs, "what could have been the next Tiny Furniture gets so wrapped up in its own narcissism that it falls flat with a dull thud".

Eye for Film's Jennie Kermode praised the film as "a powerful piece of work, as darkly hilarious as it is bleak."

Music 
Clark originally worked with a composer on an original score for Newly Single, but in the editing process decided to score the film entirely with archival music, largely unreleased American jazz music from the 1950s.

References

External links
 
 (PÖFF) Tallinn Black Nights Listing
 Festival Trailer

2017 films
2018 films
American drama films
American comedy films
Films set in Los Angeles
Films about Hollywood, Los Angeles
2017 comedy-drama films
2010s English-language films
2010s American films